Dallas County Schools (DCS) was a school bus transportation agency. Founded in 1846, Dallas County Schools offered full service and/or supplemental student transportation services to other government entities, school districts, charter schools and private schools in and around Dallas County, Texas as well as a part in Denton County. DCS also served select school districts in Parker and Tarrant Counties under its d.b.a. name TexServe. DCS was one of the top student transportation fleets in the nation and operated a fleet of approximately 2,000 buses that transported more than 75,000 children to and from school safely each day.

Corruption Scandal and Downfall
DCS went bust amid a complicated corruption scheme involving stop-arm camera contracts with Force Multiplier Solutions and its CEO, Robert Leonard. Part of the scheme, according to court papers, involved Leonard bribing officials and DCS spending millions on cameras from Leonard's company. An estimated 3,000 of the 7,000 cameras went unused or barely used. Many of them are stored in a warehouse at a bus service center in southeast Dallas.

As DCS hemorrhaged millions in taxpayer dollars, its superintendent, Dr. Rick Sorrells, agreed to a lease-buy back scheme involving four of its bus service centers. Sorrells sold the property for $25 million (USD) and agreed to lease it at a cost of $46 million (USD).

In 2017, Weatherford ISD voted to terminate its contract with DCS, which started in August 2016, citing that they're planning their own in-house transportation to their students. Following that, Coppell ISD was the second to pull out of contract with DCS in March 2017.

In November 2017, Dallas County voters chose to shut down DCS, ending the 170+ year service. The dissolution committee replaced the company's entire board. Despite that, tax payers are still on the hook for DCS's debt.

In July 2018, the dissolution committee filed suit against Sorrells, Leonard, former Dallas County Schools Board chair Larry Duncan and others. According to that lawsuit, Duncan took campaign contributions totaling $240,000 from those connected to the bribery scheme. Some of those contributions were not initially reported, the lawsuit alleges.

It also alleged Dallas County Schools lost about $125 million through the various schemes. “We'd like to reduce that price tag for the taxpayers,” said Stephanie Curtis, an attorney representing the DCS dissolution committee.

After the dissolution of DCS, the remaining districts served had to provide their own buses or turn to other school bus contractors.

School Districts Formerly Served
(These school districts now provide their own bus transportation unless otherwise noted)
Aledo ISD
Carrollton-Farmers Branch ISD
Cedar Hill ISD (Served via First Student)
Coppell ISD (Served via Durham School Services)~
Dallas ISD Public schools
Highland Park ISD (Served via Durham School Services)
Irving ISD (Served via First Student)
Lancaster ISD
Richardson ISD
Weatherford ISD~
White Settlement ISD (Served via GoldStar Transit)

In addition, DCS provided supplemental transportation services (Juvenile Justice/Substance Abuse Unit transportation services) to the following four school districts:
Duncanville ISD
Garland ISD
Grand Prairie ISD
Mesquite ISD

~ = Indicates that school district pulled out of DCS prior to shut down

References

External links
Dissolution Committee for the former Board of Dallas County School Trustees

Companies based in Texas
School bus operators
Student transport
Transport companies established in 1846
1846 establishments in Texas
Transport companies disestablished in 2018
2018 disestablishments in Texas